The economy of Jamaica is heavily reliant on services, accounting for 70% of the country's GDP. Jamaica has natural resources and a climate conducive to agriculture and tourism. The discovery of bauxite in the 1940s and the subsequent establishment of the bauxite-alumina industry shifted Jamaica's economy from sugar, and bananas.

Weakness in the financial sector, speculation, and lower levels of investment erode confidence in the productive sector. The government continues its efforts to raise new sovereign debt in local and international financial markets in order to meet its U.S. dollar debt obligations, to mop up liquidity to maintain the exchange rate and to help fund the current budget deficit.

The Jamaican government's economic policies encourage foreign investment in areas that earn or save foreign exchange, generate employment, and use local raw materials. The government also provides a wide range of incentives to investors.

Free trade zones have stimulated investment in garment assembly, light manufacturing, and data entry by foreign firms. However, over the last 5 years, the garment industry has suffered from reduced export earnings, continued factory closures, and rising unemployment. The Government of Jamaica hopes to encourage economic activity through a combination of privatization, financial sector restructuring, reduced interest rates, and by boosting tourism and related productive activities.

Economic history 
Before independence, Jamaica's economy was largely focused on agriculture with the vast majority of the labor force engaged in the production of sugar, bananas, and tobacco. According to one study, 18th century Jamaica had the highest wealth inequality in the world, as a very small, slave-owning elite was extremely wealthy while the rest of the population lived on the edge of subsistence.

These products were mainly exported to the United Kingdom, Canada, and to the United States of America. Jamaica's trade relationships expanded substantially from 1938 to 1946, with total imports almost doubling from £6,485,000 to £12,452,000. After 1962, the Jamaican government pushed for economic growth and all sectors excluding bauxite/alumina, energy, and tourism had shrunk between 1998 and 1999. In 2000, Jamaica experienced its first year of positive growth since 1995 due to continued tight macroeconomic policies.

Inflation fell from 25% in 1995 to single digits in 2000, reaching a multidecade low of 4.3% in 2004. Through periodic intervention in the market, the central bank also has prevented any abrupt drop in the exchange rate. The Jamaican dollar has been slipping, despite intervention, resulting in an average exchange rate of J$73.40 per US$1.00 and J136.2 per €1.00 (February 2011). In addition, inflation has been trending upward since 2004 and is projected to once again reach a double digit rate of 12-13% through the year 2008 due to a combination of unfavorable weather damaging crops and increasing agricultural imports and high energy prices.

Over the last 30 years, real per capita GDP increased at an average of just one percent per year, making Jamaica one of the slowest growing developing countries in the world.

To reverse this trajectory, the Government of Jamaica embarked on a comprehensive and ambitious program of reforms for which it has garnered national and international support:  a four-year Extended Fund Facility (EFF)  by  the International Monetary Fund (IMF) providing  a  support package of US$932 million;  World Bank Group and the Inter-American Development Bank (IDB) programs providing  US$510 million each to facilitate the GoJ's economic reform agenda to stabilize the economy, reduce debt and create the conditions for growth and resilience.. In addition, the International Finance Corporation (IFC) and Multilateral Investment Guarantee Agency (MIGA) will continue to support private sector development.

The reform program is beginning to bear fruit: Institutional reforms and measures to improve the environment for the private sector have started to restore confidence in the Jamaican economy. Jamaica jumped 27 places to 58 among 189 economies worldwide in the 2015 Doing Business ranking, the country's credit rating has improved and the Government has successfully raised more than US$2 billion in the international capital in the markets in 2014 and 2015..

Despite some revival, economic growth is still low: the Jamaican Government is forecasting real gross domestic product (GDP) growth of 1.9 per cent for the fiscal year 2015/2016 and the country continues to be  confronted by serious social issues that predominantly affect youth, such as high levels of crime and violence and high unemployment. Jamaica, which had seen its poverty rate drop almost 20 percent over two decades, saw it increase by eight percent in a few years.

The unemployment rate in Jamaica is approximately  6.0% (April 2022, Statistical Institute of Jamaica), with youth unemployment more than twice the national rate, albeit trending downwards (15%). However, among Jamaica's assets are its skilled labor force and strong social and governance indicators.

Primary industries

Agriculture
Agricultural production is an important contributor to Jamaica's economy. However, it is vulnerable to extreme weather, such as hurricanes and to competition from neighbouring countries such as the USA. Other difficulties faced by farmers include thefts from the farm, known as praedial larceny.  Agricultural production accounted for 7.4% of GDP in 1997, providing employment for nearly a quarter of the country. Jamaica's agriculture, together with forestry and fishing, accounted for about 6.6% of GDP in 1999. Sugar has been produced in Jamaica for centuries, it is the nation's dominant agricultural export. Sugar is produced in nearly every parish. The production of raw sugar in the year 2000 was estimated at 175,000 tons, a decrease from 290,000 tons in 1978.
 
Jamaican agriculture has been less prominent in GDP in the 2000s than other industries, hitting an all-time low between 2004 and 2008. This may have been due to a reaction to increased competition as international trade policies were enacted. For example, as NAFTA was enacted in 1993, a significant amount of Caribbean exports to the United States diminished, being out competed by Latin American exports. Another example is the Banana Import Regime's 3rd phase, in which EU nations had first given priority in banana imports to previously colonized nations. Under pressure by the World Trade Organization, the EU policy was altered to provide a non-discriminatory trade agreement. Jamaica's banana industry was easily outpriced by American companies exporting Latin American goods. Jamaica's agriculture industry is now bouncing back, growing from being 6.6% of GDP to 7.2%.

Sugar formed 7.1% of the exports in 1999 and Jamaica made up about 4.8% of the total production of sugar in the Caribbean. Sugar is also used for the production of by-products such as molasses, rum and some wallboard is made from bagasse.

Banana production in 1999 was 130,000 tons. Bananas formed 2.4% of the exports in 1999 and Jamaica formed around 7.5% of the total production of banana in the Caribbean. Jamaica stopped exporting banana in 2008 after suffering from several years of hurricanes that devastated the plantations.

Coffee is mainly grown around the Blue Mountains and in hilly areas. One type in particular, Jamaican Blue Mountain Coffee, is considered among the best in the world because at those heights in the Blue Mountains, the cooler climate causes the berries to take longer to ripen and the beans develop more of the substances which on roasting give coffee its flavor. Coffee formed 1.9% of exports in 1999. The picking season lasts from August to March. The coffee is exported from Kingston.

Cocoa is grown throughout Jamaica and local sales absorb about 1/3 of the output to be made into instant drinks and confectionery. Citrus fruit is mainly grown in the central parts of Jamaica, particularly between the elevations of 1,000-2,500 feet. The picking season lasts from November to April. Two factories in Bog Walk produce fruit juices, canned fruit, essential oils and marmalade. Coconuts are grown on the northern and eastern coasts, which provide enough copra to supply factories to make butterine, margarine, lard, edible oil & laundry soap.

Vanilla is also grown.

Other export crops are pimento, ginger, tobacco, sisal and other fruit are exported. Rice is grown around swampy areas around the Black River & around Long Bay in Hanover and Westmoreland parishes for local consumption.

As tastes have changed in Jamaica in favor of more meat and packaged food the national food import bill has grown to the point that it threatens the health of the economy. The government has responded by encouraging gardening and farming, a response which has had limited success. For example, the percentage of potatoes grown locally has increased, but imports of french fries have continued at a high level.

Animal husbandry

Pastures form a good percentage of the land in Jamaica. Many properties specialize in cattle rearing. Livestock holdings were 400,000 head of cattle, 440,000 goats, 180,000 hogs & 30,
rs of livestock are increasing, this isn't enough for local requirements for a growing population. Dairying has increased since the erection of a condensed milk factory at Bog Walk in 1940. Even so, the supply of dairy products is not enough for local requirements and there are large imports of powdered milk, butter and cheese.

Fishing
The fishing industry grew during the 1900s, primarily from the focus on inland fishing. Several thousand fishermen make a living from fishing. The shallow waters and cays off the south coast are richer than the northern waters. Other fishermen live on the Pedro Cays,  to the south of Jamaica.

Jamaica supplies about half of its fish requirements; major imports of frozen and salted fish are imported from the USA & Canada.

The total catch in 2000 was 5,676 tons, a decrease from 11,458 tons in 1997; the catch was mainly marine, with freshwater carp, barbel, etc., crustaceans & molluscs.

Forestry

By the late 1890, only  of Jamaica's original  of forest remained. Roundwood production was 881,000 cu m (31.1 million cu ft) in 2000. About 68% of the timber cut in 2000 was used as fuel wood while 32% was used for industrial use. The forests that once covered Jamaica now exist only in mountainous areas. They only supply 20% of the island timber requirements. The remaining forest is protected from further exploitation. Other accessible mountain areas are being reforested, mainly with pines, mahoe and mahogany.

Mining

Jamaica was the third-leading producer of bauxite and alumina in 1998, producing 12.6 million tons of bauxite, accounting for 10.4% of world production, and 3.46 million tons of alumina, accounting for 7.4% of world production. 8,540 million tons of bauxite was mined in 2012 and 10,200 million tons of bauxite in 2011.	

Mining and quarrying made up 4.1% of the nation's gross domestic product in 1999. Bauxite and alumina formed 55.2% of exports in 1999 and are the second-leading money earner after tourism. Jamaica has reserves of over 2 billion tonnes, which are expected to last 100 years. Bauxite is found in the central parishes of St. Elizabeth, Manchester, Clarendon, St. Catherine, St. Ann, and Trelawny. There are four alumina plants and six mines.

Jamaica has deposits of several million tons of gypsum on the southern slopes of the Blue Mountains. Jamaica produced 330,441 tons of gypsum in the year 2000, some of which was used in the local cement industry and in the manufacturing of building materials.

Other minerals present in Jamaica include marble, limestone, and silica, as well as ores of copper, lead, zinc, manganese and iron. Some of these are worked in small quantities. Petroleum has been sought, but so far none has been found.

Secondary Industries

Manufacturing
The manufacturing sector is an essential contributor to the Jamaican economy. Though manufacturing accounted for 13.9% of GDP in 1999. Jamaican companies contribute many manufactures such as food processing; oil refining; produced chemicals, construction materials, plastic goods, paints, pharmaceuticals, cartons, leather goods and cigars & assembled electronics, textiles and apparel. The garment industry is a major job employer for thousands of hundreds of locals and they formed 12.9% of exports in 1999 earning US$159 million. Chemicals formed 3.3% of the exports in 1999 earning US$40 million.

A portion of the bauxite mined on the island is processed into alumina before export.

An oil refinery is located near Kingston converts crude petroleum obtained from Venezuela into gasoline and other products. These are mainly for local use. The construction industry is growing due to new hotels and attractions being built for tourism. Construction and installation formed 10.4% of the GDP in 1999.

Manufactured goods were imported and formed 30.3% of the imports and cost US$877 million in 1999.

Since the launch of the Jamaican Logistics Hub initiative, various economic zones have been proposed throughout the country to assemble goods from other parts of the world for distribution to the Americas.

Tertiary industries

Tourism
Tourism is tied with remittances as Jamaica's top source of revenue. The tourism industry earns over 50 percent of the country's total foreign exchange earnings and provides about one-fourth of all jobs in Jamaica. Most tourist activity is centered on the island's northern coast, including the communities of Montego Bay, Ocho Rios, and Port Antonio, as well as in Negril on the island's western tip.

Some destinations include Ocho Rios, Green Grotto Caves, Y.S. Falls and Appleton Estate.  Most of the tourist sites are landmarks as well as homes for many Jamaicans. Many of the most frequented tourist sites are located mainly by water such as rivers and beaches where fishermen make a living from seafood. One of the most famous beach towns in Jamaica is Ocho Rios, a located in the parish of Saint Ann on the north coast of Jamaica. It was once a fishing village but now attracts millions of tourists yearly. The site is popular today because of the food and culture that can be found there.

Another famous location in Jamaica that attracts millions yearly is Dunn's River Falls, located in Ocho Rios; this waterfall is approximately 600 feet long and runs off into the sea. Around the location many hotels and restaurants are available and many street vendors sell food around the clock. Another well-known beach town is Negril, the party capital of the country. This beach town has many different factors to add to the night life.

Logistics

In April 2014, the Governments of Jamaica and China signed the preliminary agreements for the first phase of the Jamaican Logistics Hub (JLH) - the initiative that aims to position Kingston as the fourth node in the global logistics chain, joining Rotterdam, Dubai and Singapore, and serving the Americas. The Project, when completed, is expected to provide many jobs for Jamaicans, Economic Zones for multinational companies and much needed economic growth to alleviate the country's heavy debt-to-GDP ratio. Strict adherence to the IMF's refinancing programme and preparations for the JLH has favourably affected Jamaica's credit rating and outlook from the three biggest rating agencies.

ICT/BPO
Jamaica has made strides in developing its Information and Communications Technology (ICT) infrastructure. 

As the largest English speaking territory in the Caribbean, Jamaica is the region's leading contact centre location with over 87 information communications technology/business process outsourcing (ICT/BPO) companies operating in the country employing 44,000 full-time agents.

Taxation/Tax Rates
Jamaican tax rates are extremely favourable in world standards, the brackets are as follows:

Separate Tax Rates apply for foreign nationals.

Economic Data 
The following table shows the main economic indicators in 1980–2018. Inflation below 5% is in green.

References

Further reading 
 Bahl, R., & Wallace, S. (2007). From income tax to consumption tax? The case of Jamaica. FinanzArchiv/Public Finance Analysis, 396-414.

External links
 World Bank Trade Summary Statistics Jamaica 2012
 Partners in Austerity: Jamaica, the United States and the International Monetary Fund, from the Center for Economic and Policy Research, April 2015

 
Jamaica